The 20 Kilomètres de Paris (Paris 20 km) is an annual road running competition over 20 kilometres which takes place on the streets of Paris, France in October. First held in 1979, the race attracts top level international competitors and holds IAAF Silver Label Road Race status.

The competition was the idea of Michel Jazy, a French runner who was an Olympic medallist and two-time European Champion. The first edition was held through a joint effort by the Council of Paris and ASCAIR (the French Airforce's body for sport). The race has been organised under the auspices of ASCAIR since then.

The course for the competition has a double looped, figure 8 style. The start point of the race is in the Trocadéro near the Eiffel Tower and runners then cross the River Seine over the Pont d'Iéna. It heads in an anti-clockwise loop through Bois de Boulogne before completing a smaller, clockwise loop along the banks of the Seine. The finish point is the Musée du quai Branly. The original race distance was 20.3 km, but this was reduced to 20 km in 1981. As a result of poor race organisation at the starting point, athlete's times from 1981 to 1992 are not accepted for record purposes; unusually quick times were recorded as some runners began the race a whole minute before the official starter's gun had been fired.

The men's and women's course records for the 20 km race are held by Kenyan athletes: Evans Cheruiyot completed the distance in 57:19 minutes in 2005 and Sarah Chepchirchir's time of 1:05:03 hours was set in 2013.

The race organisers abide by their own charter of ethics which – aside from outlining typical races rules and safety issues – includes the aims of increasing inclusion of women in the sport of running and promotion of environmentally friendly attitudes.

Past winners

Key:

References

List of winners
Festou, Michel et al. (2011-10-11). Paris 20 km. Association of Road Racing Statisticians. Retrieved on 2011-10-23.

External links

Official website

Athletics competitions in France
Athletics in Paris
Recurring sporting events established in 1979
International sports competitions hosted by Paris
20K runs